Ganjabad-e Sofla (also Romanized as Ganjābād-e Soflá; also known as Ganjābād, Ganjābād-e Pā‘īn, Ganj Abad Hoomeh, Ganjābād Pā‘īn, Ganjīābād, Gonjābād, and Gonjābād-e Pā’īn) is a village in Ganjabad Rural District, Esmaili District, Anbarabad County, Kerman Province, Iran. At the 2006 census, its population was 35, in 7 families.

References 

Populated places in Anbarabad County